Piangil, once frequently spelled "Pyangil", is a town in the Mallee region of northern Victoria, Australia.

Piangil Post Office opened on 17 June 1907 and was renamed Piangil North in 1918 when Piangil was relocated adjacent to the railway station. A new Piangil Post Office opened in 1921 and is still in operation.

Piangil Primary School closed in September 2015.

Gallery

References

External links

Towns in Victoria (Australia)
Rural City of Swan Hill
Populated places on the Murray River